Coleorozena subnigra is a species of case-bearing leaf beetle in the family Chrysomelidae. It has no subspecies. It is found in North America.

References 

Clytrini
Beetles of North America
Beetles described in 1905